Kalsa or Mandamento Tribunali is a historical quarter of the Italian city of Palermo in Sicily. It is sometimes referred to as la Kalsa or the Kalsa.

Names
The common name of the quarter, Kalsa, derives from the district's historic Arabic name, al-Khāliṣa, meaning "the chosen one". The formal name of the quarter, Mandamento Tribunali, meaning "district of courts", derives from the presence of Inquisition courts at the Palazzo Chiaramonte-Steri.

History

Ancient history 

In ancient times, most of the area now known as the Kalsa was underwater. Hamilcar and Hannibal used to dock their ships there as they prepared their attacks on the Greek city of Himera. The walls of a Punic city occupied by the Phoenicians and Carthaginians once extended to the confluence of the Papyrus and Kemonia rivers, near what is now the intersection of Via Roma and Via Vittorio Emanuele.

Middle Ages 

Built in the ninth century, Al-Khalesa was one of the first planned Arab settlements in Europe. It was the administrative center of the city of Balarm (Palermo), which was under Arab rule until it was conquered by the Normans in 1072. Around 937, the Arabs moved their base from Al-Kasr (today the Cassaro, or castle district) to Al-Khalesa and built a fortified palace near the port.

In the 970s, Palermo expanded into a major Muslim city comparable to Cairo or Córdoba. In addition to housing the emir and his court, Al-Khalesa contained the arsenal and prison, baths, a mosque, and government offices. There were no shops or markets in the area. It was surrounded by a stone wall with four gates, the best known being the Bab al-bahr or Marine Gate, on the shore.

The center of Al-Khalesa was located near what is now Piazza Kalsa. Much of the square's current "Arabesque" architecture, such as the Greek Gate, is the product of 16th-century Spanish Moorish revival movements and cannot be traced directly to the emirate of Balarm. The area still has narrow, winding streets, as it did in the 11th century.

After the Normans captured Palermo, they preferred to move their headquarters to higher ground, back to the Cassaro. The Kalsa became an Arab neighborhood with markets and mosques, but eventually, just as in the rest of Sicily, Islam would disappear from the island by the early 13th century.

World War II and later 

The Kalsa district was heavily bombed during World War II, and was abandoned for decades. It attracted poor squatters, many of whom lived in the bombed-out ruins. Sicilian-American novelist Dodici Azpadu describes it as an "Arab ghetto." The area has since been revitalized and is home to art galleries, restored churches and palaces, and other tourist attractions.

Geography
Kalsa is delimited by:

Via Maqueda to the west
Via Lincoln to the south
Foro Italico to the east
Via Vittorio Emanuele or Cassaro to the north

Culture

On summer evenings, Kals'art, an arts festival, is held in the streets of Kalsa.

Sights

Monuments

Notable people

 Dodici Azpadu, New-York born American novelist. Her family emigrated from Kalsa.
 Paolo Borsellino, anti-Mafia judge.
 Tommaso Buscetta, Mafia boss and pentito.
 Giovanni Falcone, anti-Mafia judge.
 Leandro Rinaudo, football player and manager.

References

External links
Best of Sicily Website

History of Palermo
Tourist attractions in Palermo
Zones of Palermo